Louis IX may refer to:
 Louis IX of France (1214–1270)
 Louis IX, Duke of Bavaria "the Rich" (1417–1479)
 Louis IX, Landgrave of Hesse-Darmstadt (ruled 1768–1790)